Ebeko is a highly active somma volcano located on the northern end of Paramushir Island, Kuril Islands, Russia. It is one of the most active volcanoes of the Kuril Islands. Eleven eruptions have been recorded between 1793 and 1991. Most of the eruptions are small (VEI=1) with the exception of the 1859 eruption (VEI=3). Most eruptions were phreatic and explosive.

See also
List of volcanoes in Russia

References 

 

Paramushir
Active volcanoes
Volcanoes of the Kuril Islands